is a Japanese football. player clubs Chanthabouly in Lao League 1

Career
His younger brother is Yosuke Ideguchi, a midfielder of Japan and Cultural Leonesa.

Hoàng Anh Gia Lai
Ideguchi joined Vietnamese V.League 1 side Hoàng Anh Gia Lai in December 2015
.

Club statistics
Updated to 27 February 2018.

References

External links

 Profile at FC Osaka

1988 births
Living people
Hannan University alumni
Association football people from Fukuoka Prefecture
Japanese footballers
J2 League players
Japan Football League players
Hong Kong First Division League players
V.League 1 players
Yokohama FC players
FC Osaka players
Yokohama FC Hong Kong players
Hoang Anh Gia Lai FC players
Japanese expatriate sportspeople in Hong Kong
Expatriate footballers in Hong Kong
Japanese expatriate sportspeople in Vietnam
Expatriate footballers in Vietnam
Japanese expatriate sportspeople in Thailand
Expatriate footballers in Thailand
Association football midfielders
Expatriate footballers in Cambodia
Phnom Penh Crown FC players
Japanese expatriate sportspeople in Cambodia